Jabilamma Pelli  is a 1996 Telugu-language drama film, produced by Babu S. S. Burugupalli under the Lakshmi Srinivasa Art Films banner and directed by A. Kodandarami Reddy. It stars Jagapati Babu, Maheswari, Ruchita Prasad, Vanisri  and music composed by M. M. Keeravani.

Plot
The film begins in a village where Padmavathi Devi is a wealthy and well-respected woman. She lost her daughter Lakshmi years ago due to the slipping of her nephew Ramudu. Therefrom, she reared Ramudu along with her sister's daughter Jyothi an IVF specialist, and shortly went to knit them. Ramudu is an audacious village guy who always confronts the offenses of venomous Podugu Babu. At present, Padmavathi & Ramudu intends to construct a temple in the name of Lakshmi. Anjaneyulu, father of Jyothi is a knave who henchmen Podugu Babu calls a prostitute Manjari accompanying her daughter Madhura Vani. Podugu Babu keeps an evil eye on Vani but she is attracted to Ramudu. Therein, she tries to lure him to which he doesn't yield. So, she creates a mess, where Padmavathi punishes Manjari. During the village temple ceremony, enraged Vani spoils the deity installation as avenge.

Here the village decides to penalize Madhura Vani and Padmavathi edicts Ramudu to bring her. The next morning, shockingly, he gets her married. From there, Vani torments the family with her coarse behavior. Anyhow, Ramudu tolerates everything and he pays all penalties for her mistakes. One day, Vani seeks truth. Then, as a flabbergast, he reveals her as Padmavathi's long-lost daughter Lakshmi. Being cognizant of it, Vani is determined to reform and present a baby to her mother until then he requests Ramudu to be silent. Jyothi also overhears the conversation and understands the virtue of Ramudu. After some time, Vani becomes pregnant. But unfortunately, due to the evil act of Podugu Babu and Anjineeyulu, she miscarries and becomes terminally ill. To fulfill Vani's ambition Jyothi implants her uterus in herself. At that point, Padmavathi also learns the reality and embraces her daughter. At last, Vani passes away by handing over the newborn baby to her mother. Finally, the movie ends on a happy note with the wedding of Ramudu & Jyothi along with the temple inauguration.

Cast

Soundtrack

The music for the film was composed by M. M. Keeravani and released by the T-Series Music Company.

References

Films directed by A. Kodandarami Reddy
Films scored by M. M. Keeravani
1990s Telugu-language films